Handball Club Berchem is a men's handball club from Berchem, Luxembourg, that plays in the Luxembourgish Handball League.

References

External links
Official website 

HC Berchem